Laugh Bajazzo (German: Lache Bajazzo) is a 1915 German silent drama film directed by Richard Oswald and starring Rudolph Schildkraut, Alfred Abel and Hanni Weisse.

It was shot at the Weissensee Studios in Berlin.

Cast
 Rudolph Schildkraut as Musiker Rudolf 
 Alfred Abel as Schriftsteller Alfred 
 Ferdinand Bonn as HausmeisterßFaktotum 
 Hanni Weisse as Hanni Rober - Kontoristin 
 Johanna Terwin as Janni - Alfreds Frau 
 Robert Valberg
 Hanne Brinkmann
 Felix Basch
 Wilhelm Diegelmann as Rentner Lehmann 
 Hans Wassmann

References

Bibliography
 Goble, Alan. The Complete Index to Literary Sources in Film. Walter de Gruyter, 1999.
 Thomas, Douglas B. The Early History of German Motion Pictures, 1895-1935. Thomas International, 1999.

External links

1915 films
Films of the German Empire
German silent feature films
Films directed by Richard Oswald
German black-and-white films
1915 drama films
German drama films
Silent drama films
1910s German films
Films shot at Weissensee Studios